The Tussman Experimental College was an American educational project at the University of California, Berkeley that lasted from 1965 to 1969.

Founded by philosophy professor Joseph Tussman, about 300 students were chosen through a combination of selective interviews and academic standing.

The syllabus focused on big problems and cultural crisis periods in history which had driven great thinkers to tackle fundamental questions. Emphasis was given to primary sources. Grades were not given. 

The project was inspired by the University of Wisconsin Experimental College founded by Alexander Meiklejohn.

References

Trow, Katherine (1998). Habits of Mind: The Experimental College Program at Berkeley. University of California Press, 
Kreisler, Harry (January 13, 2000). Education and Citizenship: Conversation with Joseph Tussman. Conversations with History: Institute of International Studies, UC Berkeley.
Tussman, Joseph (1988). A Venture in Educational Reform An Account by the Founder of the Program

University of California, Berkeley
Educational institutions established in 1965
1965 establishments in California